Landscape with Philemon and Baucis is a 1620 painting by Flemish artist Peter Paul Rubens. It is centred on the myth of Baucis and Philemon. The painting is now located in the Kunsthistorisches Museum in Vienna.

Bibliography
Hermann Bauer: El Barroco en los Países Bajos, en Los maestros de la pintura occidental, Taschen, 2005, p. 290, 

Paintings in the collection of the Kunsthistorisches Museum
1620 paintings
Mythological paintings by Peter Paul Rubens
Paintings depicting Greek myths
Paintings based on Metamorphoses